Joseph Keosseian (born 11 January 1964) is a Puerto Rican bobsledder. He competed in the two man and the four man events at the 1998 Winter Olympics.

References

1964 births
Living people
Puerto Rican male bobsledders
Olympic bobsledders of Puerto Rico
Bobsledders at the 1998 Winter Olympics
Place of birth missing (living people)
20th-century Puerto Rican people